Vairamkode, is a small village near Thirunavaya, Malappuram District, Kerala state of India. Vairamkode is famous in the name of Vairamcode Bhagavaty Kshethram (Temple) and Theeyattu (Temple Festival)

Vairamkode Bhagavathy Temple

Vairamkode Bhagavathy Temple is one of oldest Bhadrakaali temples in Kerala. The deity here is goddess Bhadra Kaali. Vairankode Temple was constructed by Azhvanchery Thamprakkal about 1500 years ago. The sister of Kodungallur Bhagavathy cross the Bharathappuzha river and reach Azhvanchery mana. The Thamprakkal placed Bhagavaty at Vairamkode.

Vairamkode Bhagavaty Theeyattu (Vairamkode Temple Festival)

Every year, in the month of February, the festival is celebrated. The festival lasts for 6 days (from Sunday to Friday), The festival starts with Maram mury (To cut offered Jack Fruit Tree to make fire for Kanlattam) the 3rd day after Maram muri celebrating Cheriya Thiyyattu (Common Celebration). The Cheriya Thiyyattu for nearby villages. The 6th day celebration called Valiya Thiyyattu (Grand Festival).

Procession is one of the main attractions of Thiyyattu. A number of procession coming to Vairamkode with folk forms like Pootha, Thira, Kattalan, or Pulikkali from nearby villages and places. Most of the procession carries Eratta Kala (the huge decorated effigies of bullocks. Fireworks are performed after midnight. Kanalattam (Devotees walking around and on live coal) perform in the early morning.

The grand procession comes from Athavanad, the place of Azhvanchery Thamprakkal. It is the one of main attractions of Theeyaattu.

References 

   Villages in Malappuram district
Tirur area